Sarcotaces is a genus of copepod, containing the following species:
 Sarcotaces arcticus Collett, 1874
 Sarcotaces japonicus Izawa, 1974
 Sarcotaces komaii Shiino, 1953
 Sarcotaces namibiensis      Reimer, 1991
 Sarcotaces pacificus      Komai, 1924
 Sarcotaces shiinoi          Izawa, 1974
 Sarcotaces verrucosus       Olsson, 1872

Description
All live in salt water.  All are parasites.  Some live on the skin of their hosts; others live inside them.

References

Poecilostomatoida